Toome or Toomebridge is a small  village and townland on the northwest corner of Lough Neagh in County Antrim, Northern Ireland. It lies in the civil parish of Duneane in the former barony of Toome Upper, and is in the Antrim and Newtownabbey Borough Council area. It had a population of 781 in the 2011 census.

History
In the fifth and/or sixth centuries there was a woman in this parish of Dún dá Én (Duneane) known as Ercnat ingen Dáire. In 800 she was remembered as a saint but her cult was forgotten.

Roddy McCorley, a Presbyterian radical, was a local of the parish of Duneane. He fought as a United Irishman in the Rebellion of 1798 against British rule in Ireland but was captured. He was hanged on 28 February 1800 "near the bridge of Toome", which had been partially destroyed by rebels in 1798 to prevent the arrival of reinforcements from west of the River Bann. His body was then dissected by the British and buried under the road that went from Belfast to Derry.  In 1852, when the road was being reconstructed, a nephew had McCorley's body exhumed and given a proper burial in an unmarked grave in Duneane. A memorial in honour of McCorley now stands in Toome as you enter the village from County Londonderry.   His story became the subject of a popular song written in 1898 by Ethna Carbery.

Economy 
The largest industry in Toome is eel fishing, supplying the European market. The eel fisheries have been commemorated in a number of poems by Seamus Heaney.

Within the last century mining for diatomite has developed as extensive deposits are found in the Toome area. This mineral was used as an absorbent for gelignite and for toothpaste.

Sport
The local Gaelic Athletic Association club in the area is Erins Own, Cargin.

Some of the most thrilling motor boat (hydroplane) racing ever seen in Ireland took place at Toombridge on the River Bann in 1930. Hydroplanes from Ulster, the Irish Free State and England took part in the 'Bann 100'. The main trophies was The Belfast Newsletter Challenge trophy. Hydroplanes reached speeds of 34.77 mph.

Transport

Toome had long been a bottleneck to traffic on the main Belfast to Derry road route. Construction of a bypass began in May 2002 and was completed in March 2004, shortening journey times and relieving congestion in the village.

Toome Bridge railway station was opened on 10 November 1856, shut for passenger traffic on 28 August 1950 and shut altogether on 1 October 1959.

Population

2011 census
In the 2011 census, Toome had a population of 781 (263 households); 91% were from a Catholic background and 6.3% were from a Protestant background.

2001 census
Toome is classified as a small village or hamlet by the NI Statistics and Research Agency (i.e. with population between 500 and 1,000).
On census day (29 April 2001) there were 722 people living in Toome. Of these:
27.2% were aged under 16 years and 10.9% were aged 60 and over
48.8% were male and 51.3% were female
96.3% were from a Catholic background and 2.9% were from a Protestant background
6.2% of people aged 16–74 were unemployed

1911 census
In the 1911 census, Toome had a population of 194. Of these:
72.7% were Catholic and 27.3% were Protestant

Notable people
 Motorcycle road racers Michael, John and Eugene Laverty are from Toome.
Willie John McBride, Rugby Union player, is a native of Toome who lives in Ballyclare.
Robin John Bailie (1937-), solicitor, businessman and former Ulster Unionist Party and Alliance politician.
 Deirdre Madden (1960-), writer, was born in Toome.

See also 
List of towns and villages in Northern Ireland

References

Notes

Sources

Toome By-Pass
Palaeoenvironmental Investigations at Toome By-pass
Culture Northern Ireland

External links
River Bann, Ireland - Toome visitor information (archived)
Landscapes Unlocked - Aerial footage from the BBC Sky High series explaining the physical, social and economic geography of Northern Ireland.

Villages in County Antrim
Townlands of County Antrim
Civil Parish of Duneane